Fossil Mountain refers to several mountains, including:

 Fossil Mountain (Alberta) in Alberta, Canada
 Fossil Mountain (Alaska) in Alaska, United States
 Fossil Mountain (Arizona) in Arizona, United States
 Fossil Mountain (Colorado) in Colorado, United States
 Fossil Mountain (Montana) a mountain in Powell County, Montana, United States
 Fossil Mountain (Utah) in Utah, United States
 Fossil Mountain (Wyoming) in Wyoming, United States